Cylch-grawn Cynmraeg was an 18th-century Welsh language magazine, first produced by Baptist minister Morgan John Rhys in 1793. It contained articles on religious and political subjects, and poetry and biographies, and some general news. Amongst its contributors was poet David Morris (Dafydd Ddu Eryri, 1759-1822).

References 

Welsh-language magazines
Periodicals published in Wales
Music magazines published in the United Kingdom